Devene Point (\'nos 'de-ve-ne\) is the narrow rock-tipped point projecting 600 m westwards into Dallmann Bay, and forming the northeast side of the entrance to Buragara Cove on the west coast of Brabant Island in the Palmer Archipelago, Antarctica.  It was formed as a result of the retreat of Rush Glacier near the start of the 21st century.

The point is named after the settlement of Devene in Northwestern Bulgaria.

Location

Maps 
 Antarctic Digital Database (ADD). Scale 1:250000 topographic map of Antarctica. Scientific Committee on Antarctic Research (SCAR). Since 1993, regularly upgraded and updated.
British Antarctic Territory. Scale 1:200000 topographic map. DOS 610 Series, Sheet W 64 62. Directorate of Overseas Surveys, Tolworth, UK, 1980.
Brabant Island to Argentine Islands. Scale 1:250000 topographic map. British Antarctic Survey, 2008.

References 
 Devene Point on AADC website
 Devene Point on SCAR website

External links
 Devene Point. Copernix satellite image
 Bulgarian Antarctic Gazetteer. Antarctic Place-names Commission. (details in Bulgarian, basic data in English)
 Devene Point. SCAR Composite Antarctic Gazetteer.

Headlands of the Palmer Archipelago
Bulgaria and the Antarctic